The following outline is provided as an overview of and topical guide to Afghanistan:

Afghanistan – landlocked sovereign country located in Central and South Asia. Since the late 1970s Afghanistan has experienced a continuous state of civil war.

General reference

 Pronunciation:
 Common English country name: Afghanistan
 Official English country name: Islamic Emirate of Afghanistan
 Common endonym(s):  
 Official endonym(s):  
 Adjectival(s): Afghan
 Demonym(s): Afghans
 Etymology: Name of Afghanistan
 International rankings of Afghanistan
 ISO country codes: AF, AFG, 004
 ISO region codes: See ISO 3166-2:AF
 Internet country code top-level domain:  .af

Geography of Afghanistan

Geography of Afghanistan
 Afghanistan is: a landlocked country
 Location:
 Northern Hemisphere and Eastern Hemisphere
 Eurasia
 Asia
 (Central Asia)
 (South Asia)
 Greater Middle East
 Iranian plateau
 Time zone: UTC+04:30
 Extreme points of Afghanistan
 High:  Noshaq 
 Low:  Amu Darya 
 Land boundaries:  5,529 km
 2,430 km
 1,206 km
 936 km
 744 km
 137 km
 76 km
 Coastline:  none
 Population of Afghanistan: 39,864,082 (2021 estimate) – 43rd most populous country
 Area of Afghanistan:  – 40th largest country
 Atlas of Afghanistan

Environment of Afghanistan

Environment of Afghanistan
 Climate of Afghanistan
 Ecoregions in Afghanistan
 Environmental issues in Afghanistan
 Protected areas of Afghanistan
 Renewable energy in Afghanistan
 Wildlife of Afghanistan
 Fauna of Afghanistan
 Birds of Afghanistan
 Mammals of Afghanistan

Natural geographic features of Afghanistan
 Mountains of Afghanistan
 Volcanoes in Afghanistan
 Rivers of Afghanistan
 List of World Heritage Sites in Afghanistan

Regions of Afghanistan

Regions of Afghanistan

Ecoregions of Afghanistan

List of ecoregions in Afghanistan

Administrative divisions of Afghanistan

Administrative divisions of Afghanistan

 Provinces of Afghanistan
 Districts of Afghanistan

Provinces of Afghanistan

Provinces of Afghanistan
 Badakhshan Province
 Badghis Province
 Baghlan Province
 Balkh Province
 Bamyan Province
 Daykundi Province
 Farah Province
 Faryab Province
 Ghazni Province
 Ghor Province
 Helmand Province
 Herat Province
 Jowzjan Province
 Kabul Province
 Kandahar Province
 Kapisa Province
 Khost Province
 Kunar Province
 Kunduz Province
 Laghman Province
 Lowgar Province
 Nangarhar Province
 Nimruz Province
 Nurestan Province
 Orūzgān Province
 Paktia Province
 Paktika Province
 Panjshir Province
 Parwan Province
 Samangan Province
 Sar-e Pol Province
 Takhar Province
 Wardak Province
 Zabul Province

Districts of Afghanistan

Districts of Afghanistan
Afghanistan is divided into 398+ districts.

Municipalities of Afghanistan

Municipalities of Afghanistan
 Capital of Afghanistan: Kabul
 Cities of Afghanistan

Demography of Afghanistan

Demographics of Afghanistan

Government and politics of Afghanistan 
Politics of Afghanistan

 Taliban
 Military of Afghanistan

Structure of government 
Government of Afghanistan

 Supreme Leader of Afghanistan
 Prime Minister of Afghanistan
 Deputy Leader of Afghanistan
 Chief Justice of Afghanistan
 Leadership Council
 Council of Ministers

Government and politics of Islamic Republic of Afghanistan (2004–2021)

Politics of the Islamic Republic of Afghanistan
 Form of government: Islamic republic
 Capital of Afghanistan: Kabul
 Elections in Afghanistan
 Afghan presidential election, 2009
 Afghan parliamentary election, 2005
 Afghan presidential election, 2004
 Political parties in Afghanistan
 Taxation in Afghanistan

Branches of government

Government of Islamic Republic of Afghanistan

Executive branch of the government of Islamic Republic Afghanistan
 Head of state and head of government: President of Afghanistan
 Afghan Cabinet of Ministers

Legislative branch of the government of Islamic Afghanistan
 National Assembly of Afghanistan (bicameral)
 Upper house: House of Elders (Meshrano Jirga)
 Lower house: House of the People (Wolesi Jirga)

Judicial branch of the government of Islamic Afghanistan

 Afghan Supreme Court (Stara Makama or ستره محكمه)
 Chief Justice of Afghanistan
 High Courts of Afghanistan
 Appeals Courts of Afghanistan
 District courts of Afghanistan
 Local courts of Afghanistan

Foreign relations of Afghanistan

Foreign relations of Afghanistan
 Diplomatic missions in Afghanistan
 Diplomatic missions of Afghanistan
 United States-Afghanistan relations
 Foreign hostages in Afghanistan

International organization membership
The Islamic Republic of Afghanistan is a member of:

Asian Development Bank (ADB)
Colombo Plan (CP)
Economic Cooperation Organization (ECO)
Food and Agriculture Organization (FAO)
Group of 77 (G77)
International Atomic Energy Agency (IAEA)
International Bank for Reconstruction and Development (IBRD)
International Civil Aviation Organization (ICAO)
International Criminal Court (ICCt)
International Criminal Police Organization (Interpol)
International Development Association (IDA)
International Finance Corporation (IFC)
International Fund for Agricultural Development (IFAD)
International Labour Organization (ILO)
International Monetary Fund (IMF)
International Olympic Committee (IOC)
International Organization for Migration (IOM)
International Organization for Standardization (ISO) (correspondent)
International Telecommunication Union (ITU)
International Telecommunications Satellite Organization (ITSO)

Islamic Development Bank (IDB)
Multilateral Investment Guarantee Agency (MIGA)
Nonaligned Movement (NAM)
Organization for Security and Cooperation in Europe (OSCE) (partner)
Organisation for the Prohibition of Chemical Weapons (OPCW)
Organisation of Islamic Cooperation (OIC)
Shanghai Cooperation Organisation (SCO) (guest)
South Asia Co-operative Environment Programme (SACEP)
South Asian Association for Regional Cooperation (SAARC)
United Nations (UN)
United Nations Conference on Trade and Development (UNCTAD)
United Nations Educational, Scientific, and Cultural Organization (UNESCO)
United Nations Industrial Development Organization (UNIDO)
Universal Postal Union (UPU)
World Customs Organization (WCO)
World Federation of Trade Unions (WFTU)
World Health Organization (WHO)
World Intellectual Property Organization (WIPO)
World Meteorological Organization (WMO)
World Tourism Organization (UNWTO)
World Trade Organization (WTO)

Law and order in Islamic Republic of Afghanistan

Law of Afghanistan
 Cannabis in Afghanistan
 Capital punishment in Afghanistan
 Constitution of Afghanistan
 Crime in Afghanistan
 Human rights in Afghanistan
 LGBT rights in Afghanistan
 Freedom of religion in Afghanistan
 Law enforcement in Afghanistan

Military of Islamic Republic Afghanistan

Afghan Armed Forces (2002-2021)
 Command
 Commander-in-chief:
 President of Afghanistan
 Afghan National Security Forces
Afghan Armed Forces
Afghan National Army
Afghan Air Force
Afghan National Police
Afghan Local Police
Afghan Border Police
National Directorate of Security

Local government in Afghanistan

Local government in Afghanistan

History of Afghanistan

History of Afghanistan
Timeline of the history of Afghanistan
Current events of Afghanistan

By period 
 Ancient history of Afghanistan
 Greater Khorasan
 Muslim conquests of Afghanistan
 History of Arabs in Afghanistan
 Mongol invasion of Central Asia
 Hotak dynasty
 Siege of Kandahar
 Durrani Empire
 Third Battle of Panipat
 Battle of Jamrud
 First Anglo-Afghan War
 Second Anglo-Afghan War
 Third Anglo-Afghan War
 European influence in Afghanistan
 Reforms of Amanullah Khan and civil war
 Reigns of Nadir Shah and Zahir Shah
 Daoud's Republic of Afghanistan
 Democratic Republic of Afghanistan
 Soviet–Afghan War
 History of Afghanistan since 1992
 War in Afghanistan (2001–2021)

By subject 
 History of Arabs in Afghanistan
 Military history of Afghanistan

Culture of Afghanistan

Culture of Afghanistan

 :Category:Ethnic groups in Afghanistan
 Architecture of Afghanistan
 :Category:Afghan tribes
 Cuisine of Afghanistan
 Gender roles in Afghanistan
 Languages of Afghanistan
 Media in Afghanistan
 National symbols of Afghanistan
 Emblem of Afghanistan
 Flag of Afghanistan
 National anthem of Afghanistan
 People of Afghanistan
 Ethnic minorities in Afghanistan
 Prostitution in Afghanistan
 Public holidays in Afghanistan
 List of World Heritage Sites in Afghanistan

Art in Afghanistan 
 Art in Afghanistan
 Cinema of Afghanistan
 Music of Afghanistan
 Television in Afghanistan

People of Afghanistan 
 People of Afghanistan
 Pashtun people
 Tājik people
 Farsiwan
  Qizilbash
 Hazara people
 Uzbek people
 Turkmen people
 Baloch people
 Nuristani people
 Arabs
 Persian (Dari)
 Sunni Muslim
  Shi'a Muslim

Religion in Afghanistan 
 Religion in Afghanistan
 Buddhism in Afghanistan
 Christianity in Afghanistan
 Hinduism in Afghanistan
 Islam in Afghanistan
 Judaism in Afghanistan
 Sikhism in Afghanistan

Sports in Afghanistan

Sports in Afghanistan
 Football in Afghanistan
 Afghanistan at the Olympics

Economy and infrastructure of Afghanistan

Economy of Afghanistan
 Economic rank, by nominal GDP (2007): 119th (one hundred and nineteenth)
 Agriculture in Afghanistan
 Communications in Afghanistan
 Internet in Afghanistan
 Companies of Afghanistan
Currency of Afghanistan: Afghani
ISO 4217: AFN
 Energy in Afghanistan
 Energy in Afghanistan
 Health care in Afghanistan
 Mining in Afghanistan
 Taxation in Afghanistan
 Tourism in Afghanistan
 Visa policy of Afghanistan
 Transport in Afghanistan
 Airports in Afghanistan
 Rail transport in Afghanistan

Education in Afghanistan

Education in Afghanistan

Health in Afghanistan 

Health in Afghanistan

See also

Topic overview:
Afghanistan

Bibliography of Afghanistan
List of international rankings
Member state of the United Nations

References

External links

 Official government sites

 General information
Afghanistan's Paper Money
World Intellectual Property Handbook: Afghanistan

 Culture and news
KabulPress.org
Islamic Republic Of Afghanistan (Cultural issues)
Afghan Online Press
Bakhtar News Agency (Official Afghan Agency)

 Other
Old photos of Afghanistan
How Hemp could save Afghanistan
Afghanistan: The Genesis of the Final *[http://www.afghan-web.com/language/ A Look at the Languages Spoken in Afghanistan
Over 125 recent travel photos from Afghanistan

 
 
Afghanistan